Jim Deere (born June 2, 1967) is an American football coach and former player.  Deere is the head football coach at the Adrian College in Adrian, Michigan, a position he had held since 2010.  Deere played college football at Adrian as a defensive back from 1985 to 1988.

Coaching career at Adrian
In 2014 Deere lead the Adrian to their second outright Michigan Intercollegiate Athletic Association (MIAA) title in three seasons, previously winning the outright MIAA title in 2012.  The 2012 MIAA title was the first outright MIAA title since 1983 and featured a perfect 6–0 record in MIAA play. Adrian returned to the NCAA Division III playoffs in 2014, marking the second appearance under Deere and the fourth in program history, losing to eventual national champion runner-up, Mount Union. Under Deere, in 2012, Adrian hosted an NCAA Division III playoff game for the first time in school history, losing to the Franklin Grizzlies.

Head coaching record

References

External links
 Adrian profile

1967 births
American football defensive backs
Living people
Adrian Bulldogs football coaches
Adrian Bulldogs football players
High school football coaches in Michigan